Sahdev Dirdo is an Indian child artist from Chhattisgarh who became famous for his song "Bachpan ka Pyar" which got 20 million views in 24 hours of its posting. His song was selected as one of the "This Week’s Top 5 Songs" by Outlook India. His has also sung Bella ciao which went viral. His video in YouTube which was uploaded by Badshah has more than 473 million views. He will also work in Bollywood films.

References 

Living people
2007 births